Arenga listeri, the Lister's palm, is a species of flowering plant in the family Arecaceae. It is named after naturalist Joseph Jackson Lister.

It is endemic to Christmas Island and is threatened by habitat loss.

The palm is featured on a 1978 postage stamp of Christmas Island together with Lister.

References

listeri
Endemic flora of Christmas Island
Vulnerable plants
Taxa named by Odoardo Beccari
Taxonomy articles created by Polbot
Plants described in 1891